Robert I. Frost  (born 1958) is a British historian and academic. His interests are in the history of Eastern and Northern Europe of 14th to the 19th centuries, with primary focus on Poland–Lithuania and the history of warfare of the period.

He attended the University of St Andrews and the Jagiellonian University in Kraków, Poland.  He earned his doctorate in the School of Slavonic and East European Studies at the University of London.

He was a schoolmaster for three years in the mid-1980s. Frost became a temporary and permanent lecturer in history at King's College London, in 1987 and 1988 respectively, and Reader in 2001. He served as head of department there for three years. In 2004, he was appointed professor of early modern history at the University of Aberdeen, and there he served as head of the School of Divinity, History and Philosophy from 2004 to 2009. In 2013, he was appointed to the Burnett-Fletcher Chair of History.

Bibliography
 The Northern Wars, War, State and Society in Northeastern Europe, 1558-1721, 2000
 After the Deluge: Poland–Lithuania and the Second Northern War, 1655-1660, 1994
 Co-editor, with Anne Goldgar, Institutional Culture in Early Modern Society, 2004
 The Oxford History of Poland–Lithuania (The Oxford History of Early Modern Europe)
Vol. I: "The Making of the Polish–Lithuanian Union, 1385-1569", 2015,

References

1960s births
Living people
Jagiellonian University alumni
Alumni of the UCL School of Slavonic and East European Studies
Academics of King's College London
British historians
Alumni of the University of St Andrews
Academics of the University of Aberdeen